Sennius is a genus of pea and bean weevils in the family Chrysomelidae. There are at least 20 described species in Sennius.

Species
These 28 species belong to the genus Sennius:

 Sennius abbreviatus (Say, 1824) i c g b
 Sennius batesii Jekel, 1855 g
 Sennius bondari Pic g
 Sennius bruneus Silva, Ribeiro-Costa & Johnson, 2003 g
 Sennius crudelis Ribeiro-Costa & Reynaud g
 Sennius cruentatus (Horn, 1873) i c g b
 Sennius discolor (Horn, 1873) i c g b
 Sennius falcatus Kingsolver & Ribeiro-Costa, 2001 g
 Sennius fallax (Boheman, 1839) i c g
 Sennius flinte g
 Sennius guttifer (Sharp, 1885) b
 Sennius kingsolveri Silva, Ribeiro-Costa & Johnson, 2003 g
 Sennius lawrencei Johnson, 1977 g
 Sennius lebasi (Fahraeus, 1839) i c g b
 Sennius leptophyllicola Ribeiro-Costa g
 Sennius leucostauros Johnson & Kingsolver, 1973 i c g b
 Sennius lojaensis Pic, 1933 g
 Sennius maculatus Silva, Ribeiro-Costa & Johnson, 2003 g
 Sennius medialis (Sharp, 1885) i c g
 Sennius morosus (Sharp, 1885) i c g b
 Sennius nappi Ribeiro-Costa & Reynaud g
 Sennius niger Silva, Ribeiro-Costa & Johnson, 2003 g
 Sennius obesulus (Sharp, 1885) i c g
 Sennius rufomaculatus (Motschulsky, 1874) g
 Sennius simulans (Schaeffer, 1907) i c
 Sennius ventralis Fahraeus, 1839 g
 Sennius vivi g
 Sennius whitei Johnson and Kingsolver, 1973 i c g

Data sources: i = ITIS, c = Catalogue of Life, g = GBIF, b = Bugguide.net

References

Further reading

External links

 

Bruchinae
Articles created by Qbugbot
Chrysomelidae genera